The 1996 Macau Grand Prix Formula Three was the 43rd Macau Grand Prix race to be held on the streets of Macau on 17 November 1996. It was the thirteenth edition for Formula Three cars.

Entry list

Race Results

References

External links
 The official website of the Macau Grand Prix

Macau Grand Prix
Grand
Macau